Countess of Mansfield is a title that may be held by a woman in her own right or by the wife of the Earl of Mansfield. Women who have held the title include:

Countesses in their own right
Louisa Murray, 2nd Countess of Mansfield (1758–1843)

Countesses by marriage
Frederica Murray, Countess of Mansfield (1774-1837)